Si 363 is a bifunctional organosilane chemical used in the reinforcement of rubber articles, especially tires. SI363 is the trade name of a silane bonding agent in the trialkoxymercaptoalkyl-silane class and of formula SH(CH2)H3Si(OCHH2CHH3)(O(CHH2CHH2O)H5(CHH2)H12CHH3)H2.

When applied to tires, Si 363 reduces rolling resistance, thus leading to increased fuel economy. Both alkoxsilicon and sulfur entities are present within its molecular structure.

References

Rubber